Corporate Crime in the Pharmaceutical Industry is a 1984 book on corporate crime and the pharmaceutical industry by criminologist John Braithwaite.

The author writes from the perspective of a criminologist and not from a perspective of expertise in drug law or pharmacology.

Various reviewers commented on the book.

The author produced a follow up book 30 years later titled, Pharmaceuticals, Corporate Crime and Public Health. At the release of that new book a reviewer reconsidered the 1984 book in retrospect and reported that the book's ideas were still relevant.

The book is available at the Internet Archive.

References

1984 non-fiction books
Non-fiction crime books
Corporate crime
Pharmaceutical industry